Dead Sight is the second album by New Zealand alternative rock band Villainy, released in New Zealand 18 September 2015 by Warner Music Group and in Australia on 6 November 2015 by MGM Distribution.

Track listing

Charts

Personnel
Adapted from the album's liner notes.

Villainy
 Neill Fraser – guitar, vocals, Organ
 Dave Johnston – drums, percussion
 Thomas Watts – guitar
 James Dylan – bass

Production
Tom Larkin – producer, mixing ("Syria")
Samuel K – engineer, mixing (except "Syria)
Brian Lucey – mastering
Dave Johnston – additional recording
Ben Ehrenberg – additional recording
Jon Grace – additional recording
Barny Bewick – package design

References

2015 albums
Villainy (band) albums
Albums produced by Tom Larkin